South Choctaw Academy is a private, co-educational PK-12 school in Choctaw County, Alabama, near Toxey.

History
South Choctaw Academy was founded in 1969 as a segregation academy.

During the 2015-2016 school year, the student body was all white.

Academics
In 2018, ten percent of the graduating class won scholarships from the local electric company.

See also

References

Private high schools in Alabama
Education in Choctaw County, Alabama
Segregation academies in Alabama
Private middle schools in Alabama
Private elementary schools in Alabama
Educational institutions established in 1969